The GT by Citroën (sometimes spelled GTbyCitroën) is a sports car that debuted as a concept car on October 2 at the 2008 Paris Motor Show. The car is a collaboration between the French automaker Citroën and the Japanese racing simulation developer Polyphony Digital. Six cars were expected to be built, with an expected MSRP of $2,100,000; however, the production run was allegedly cancelled in 2010 due to high costs.

Design

Joint venture
The GT by Citroën concept car was specially created, designed and produced for the video game Gran Turismo 5 and was included through download in its initial version Gran Turismo 5 Prologue. Its designer came up with the project and sold it to both Polyphony Digital and Citroën.

Citroën
The car's exterior design was made by Takumi Yamamoto, a Japanese designer from Jean-Pierre Ploué's Style Citroën design team. Takumi Yamamoto was a childhood friend of Kazunori Yamauchi, director of Polyphony Digital and creator of the popular Gran Turismo franchise, also known as "Gegge". According to a Yamauchi interview at the Paris Motor Show 2008, he and Yamamoto started collaborating on this project back in 2003. A press release published on the North American Gran Turismo official website describes the Citroën and Polyphony Digital collaboration as "a joint effort first talked about at the Geneva Motor Show past March" [2008]. Yamamoto convinced Jean-Pierre Ploué to submit his concept to Citroën's head office in Paris who agreed to start the production process and manufacture the real car. The concept car's rear was carefully designed to fit what the gamers will actually see in the game since it is the more powerful featured vehicle, argues Yamamoto.

Polyphony Digital
As a world leading racing simulation developer shipping more than 50 million copies since 1998 Polyphony Digital had collaborated with real life Japanese performance parts makers and tuners, mainly related to Nissan, since January 2002. Notable collaborations include aero parts development for the Nismo Fairlady Z s-tune (2002), Nismo Skyline Coupé (2004), Amuse S2000 Street Version (2003), Nismo Fairlady Z (2005), Opera Performance's Carmate Opera Z (2005) Tokyo Auto Salon show car. Polyphony Digital also did exterior design for the Amuse S2000 GT1 (2005) and artwork design for the Formula Nippon racing team Impul racer (2006).

Most of these cars had their virtual counterpart featured in the Gran Turismo games as "Concept by Gran Turismo". Some of the parts designed by Polyphony Digital such as the Carmate Opera Z's full aero kit including front bumper, sideskirts, rear bumper and rear spoiler, were eventually manufactured and sold by Japanese tuner Opera Performance as the 350Z RS aero kit. Latest collaborations include interior design of the Nissan GT-R with the creation of the Multifunction Meter device (2007) and aero parts design for the Amuse GT1 Turbo (2008). The GT by Citroën project with its complete production process is a step further in design for Polyphony Digital.

Technical specifications

In game
Ever since Gran Turismo 5 Prologue, there have been three versions of the GT by Citroën. All specifications of each version are from the most recent release of Polyphony Digital's Gran Turismo franchise, Gran Turismo Sport.
Road version - , 
Gr.4 version - , 
Race/Gr.3 version - , 
Concept version - , 
The concept version in the game features a battery powering four electric motors delivering . In Gran Turismo Sport, only the road and race version (christened as a "Gr.3" class race car, equivalent to Group GT3 class race car) is featured, in addition to a lightly-modified "Gr.4" racing version (equivalent to GT4 class race car).

In real life

Production
In June 2009, Citroën confirmed plans to produce an extremely limited number of GTs for sale to the public. Only 6 will be built, each costing $2.1 million.  In July 2010, rumours that production was suspended began to surface, citing excessive engineering and development costs relative to the size of the production run as the reason.

Appearances
The car made its debut appearance in the Gran Turismo series, and has continued on ever since, and it also had a non-Sony appearance in the discontinued Facebook game Car Town. Its Car Town appearance marked its only non-GT appearance until its announcement in Asphalt 8: Airborne on September 30, 2016. It was added in the 2016 Autumn Update for the game released on October 13, 2016. It also was added in Asphalt 9, especifically, the Full Throttle Update, released on December 10, 2020 for iOS and Android, and on December 15 of the same year for Windows.

The GT was added to The Crew 2 as part of the free "Blazing Shots" update in November 2019, however the Gran Turismo logo has been removed from its livery and only the checkerboard pattern remains.

References

External links

“GT-by-CITROEN” Concept revealed at Paris Motor Show
GT by Citroën: The book of the making of

Citroën concept vehicles
Citroen GT
Citroen GT
Gran Turismo (series)
Citroen